Escadron d'Hélicoptères 5/67 Alpilles is a French Air and Space Force (Armée de l'air et de l'espace) Helicopter squadron located at BA 115 Orange-Caritat Air Base, Vaucluse, France which operates the Eurocopter Fennec.

During the December 2013 the unit sent one Fennec to the Central African Republic as part of Operation Sangaris.

See also

 List of French Air and Space Force aircraft squadrons

References

French Air and Space Force squadrons